Flat Out may refer to:

 Flat Out (horse), a racehorse
 Flat Out (Buck Dharma album), 1982
 Flat Out (John Scofield album), 1989
Flatout, a brand of Flatbreads owned by T. Marzetti Company
Flat Out, a term coined in reference to the speed in which a Rock Flathead moves through water, coined by Maddog Stratford in 1927 on a fishing charter in Corner Inlet, Victoria
 FlatOut (series), a demolition derby/racing video game series developed by Bugbear Entertainment
 FlatOut (video game) (2004)
 FlatOut 2 (2006)
 FlatOut 3: Chaos & Destruction (2011)
 FlatOut 4: Total Insanity (2017)